Kim Clijsters was the defending champion, but withdrew before her third round match against Laura Granville due to a wrist injury which would ultimately sideline her for the remainder of the season.

Top seed Justine Henin-Hardenne won the title, defeating Lindsay Davenport in the final, 6–1, 6–4.

Seeds
All seeded players received a bye for the first round.

  Justine Henin-Hardenne (champion)
  Kim Clijsters (third round, withdrew)
  Lindsay Davenport (final)
  Anastasia Myskina (semifinals)
  Chanda Rubin (withdrew)
  Vera Zvonareva (fourth round)
  Nadia Petrova (third round)
  Paola Suárez (third round)
  Jelena Dokić (second round)
  Anna Smashnova-Pistolesi (third round)
  Conchita Martínez (quarterfinals)
  Svetlana Kuznetsova (quarterfinals)
  Magdalena Maleeva (second round)
  Francesca Schiavone (second round)
  Fabiola Zuluaga (quarterfinals)
  Maria Sharapova (fourth round)
  Magüi Serna (second round)
  Lisa Raymond (third round)
  Nathalie Dechy (semifinals)
  Meghann Shaughnessy (fourth round)
  Tina Pisnik (second round)
  Alicia Molik (third round)
  Eleni Daniilidou (second round)
  Daniela Hantuchová (second round)
  María Sánchez Lorenzo (second round)
  Karolina Šprem (second round)
  Petra Mandula (second round)
  Saori Obata (second round)
  Elena Likhovtseva (second round)
  Émilie Loit (second round)
  María Vento-Kabchi (third round)
  Cara Black (second round)
  Amy Frazier (fourth round)

Draw

Finals

Top half

Section 1

Section 2

Section 3

Section 4

Bottom half

Section 5

Section 6

Section 7

Section 8

Qualifying

Seeds

Qualifiers

Lucky losers

Qualifying draw

First qualifier

Second qualifier

Third qualifier

Fourth qualifier

Fifth qualifier

Sixth qualifier

Seventh qualifier

Eighth qualifier

Ninth qualifier

Tenth qualifier

Eleventh qualifier

Twelfth qualifier

References
Official results archive (ITF)
Official results archive (WTA)

2004 WTA Tour
2004 Pacific Life Open